Trinidad Lake State Park is a state park  west of Trinidad, Colorado, United States. The park protects Trinidad Lake, a dammed reservoir. There are hiking trails, and camping and boating opportunities. The park features historical attractions such as the coal mining ruins at Cokedale. An exposure of the Cretaceous–Paleogene boundary (K–Pg boundary) is visible in the southern part of the park.

A portion of the mountain route of the Santa Fe Trail runs through the park.

See also
Fishers Peak State Park

References

External links

State parks of Colorado
Protected areas of Las Animas County, Colorado
Protected areas established in 1980
1980 establishments in Colorado